The Iceman is a 2012 American biographical crime film loosely based on hitman Richard Kuklinski. Released in 2012 at the Venice Film Festival, the film was directed by Ariel Vromen, and stars Michael Shannon as Kuklinski, Winona Ryder, Chris Evans, and Ray Liotta.

The movie was presented at Venice film festival. Also showed at the 2012 Telluride Film Festival and the 2012 Toronto International Film Festival before receiving a limited release in cinemas in the United States on May 3, 2013. It expanded into more cinemas in the USA on May 17. It was released to DVD on September 3.

Plot
When a man insults Richard Kuklinski's fiancée during a game of pool, he follows the man to his car and murders him by slashing his throat. Kuklinski marries Deborah in 1964 and the couple have two daughters. Kuklinski presents himself to everyone as a normal working man, but he has a dark, violent side that he hides. As a boy, he and his younger brother were the subject of brutal beatings from their immigrant Polish father, shaping the boys into emotionally disturbed, sadistic young men. His brother is serving a life sentence in prison for raping and murdering a 12-year old girl.

Kuklinski works dubbing pornographic films, but tells his wife he dubs cartoons. The mob-backed company he works for is shut down by Roy DeMeo, a powerful New York City gangster. DeMeo tests Kuklinski by having him kill a homeless man, then hires him as an enforcer and contract killer. In 1975, Kuklinski moves his family into a nice suburban home and starts telling people he works at a currency trading company. He is ordered to kill a man who betrayed DeMeo, but finds a teenage girl in the closet afterwards. Freezy, a freelance hitman also hired by DeMeo, almost kills her, but is stopped by Kuklinski. DeMeo, already involved in a dispute with the Cali Cartel, is furious when he learns what happened and decommissions Kuklinski indefinitely. Needing money, he makes a deal with Freezy to carry out his murder contracts for him in return for half the bounties.

Kuklinski's home life is beginning to unravel. He starts becoming incapable of hiding his inner rage and shows bursts of anger towards his wife and strangers. DeMeo's boss Leo Merks hires Freezy to kill one of DeMeo's associates, which Kuklinski does by poisoning him with cyanide. DeMeo finds out about the hits Kuklinski has been doing behind his back and threatens to kill his family if they ever cross paths again. Kuklinski then goes to Leo Merks to collect the bounty money, but Leo is furious that the job was not untraceable. He refuses to pay anything, prompting Kuklinski to shoot him dead. Kuklinski's daughter is hospitalized after a hit-and-run by DeMeo. Both Kuklinski and Freezy have to go on the run to escape DeMeo, but Kuklinski kills Freezy for suggesting that they kill each other's families to prevent them from talking to the police and then claiming that he already knows where Kuklinski lives (although Kuklinski is certain that he has never mentioned his address to Freezy).

Following an undercover sting operation, Kuklinski is arrested in 1986. Neither his wife nor his daughters had ever suspected him of being a killer. Kuklinski admits to having committed over 100 murders, both for personal reasons and for profit, in his 22-year career. After being sentenced to two life terms in prison, he never sees his wife and daughters again. As the movie ends, Kuklinski's only regret is hurting his family through the crimes he committed. In 2006, he dies in a prison hospital, from a rare inflammatory disease; the film's closing intertitles indicate that foul play was suspected in his death as he was scheduled to testify at the trial of a Gambino family underboss.

Cast
Michael Shannon as Richard Kuklinski
 Winona Ryder as Deborah Kuklinski (based  on Barbara Kuklinski)
 Chris Evans as Robert "Mr. Freezy" Pronge (based on Robert "Mister Softee" Prongay)
 Ray Liotta as Roy DeMeo
 James Franco as Marty Freeman
 David Schwimmer as Josh Rosenthal (based on Chris Rosenberg)
 Stephen Dorff as Joseph Kuklinski
 Erin Cummings as Ellen
 Robert Davi as Leo Merks (based on Anthony Gaggi)
 Weronika Rosati as Livi
 John Ventimiglia as Mickey Scicoli
 Christa Campbell as Adele
 McKaley Miller as Anabel Kuklinski
 Danny A. Abeckaser as Dino Lapron
 Ryan O'Nan as Terry Franzo (based on George Malliband)
 Eduardo Yanez as Dominick Provenzano
 Vincent Fuentes as J.C.
 Ashlynn Ross as Alex
 Steven Hinckley as Prison Guard

Production
Filming took place in Los Angeles, California, New York City and Shreveport, Louisiana. Shannon's portrayal of Kuklinski includes the authentic voice Kuklinski had, as evidenced by his interviews with HBO in their 1993 documentary Conversations with a Killer.

Release

The Iceman screened out of competition at the 69th Venice International Film Festival in August 2012. The film screened at the 2012 Toronto International Film Festival in September that year. It was released in the United States on May 3, 2013. The film made $4.5 million during its theatrical run.

Critical reception
The Iceman has an approval rating of 66% on Rotten Tomatoes, with an average score of 6.20/10 based on 128 reviews. The site's consensus reads: "While it deserved stronger direction and a more fully realized script, Michael Shannon's riveting performance in the title role is more than enough to make The Iceman recommended viewing." On Metacritic, the film has a score of 60 out of 100 based on 28 reviews, indicating "mixed or average reviews".

Stephen Holden of The New York Times wrote that while the film is not "a great crime movie...it is an indelible film that clinches Mr. Shannon's status as a major screen actor." Tomas Hachard of Slant Magazine gave the film 1.5 out of 4 stars. Meanwhile, Ben Kenigsberg of The A.V. Club gave the film a C+ rating. David Rooney of The Hollywood Reporter noted that "the film's chief asset is without question its performances." Peter Bradshaw of The Guardian gave the film 3 out of 5 stars, describing it as "Zodiac meets Goodfellas". Metro also gave it 3 out of 5 stars. Michael Phillips of Chicago Tribune gave it 3 out of 4 stars, commenting that the film is "sleek, purposeful and extremely well acted". Oliver Lyttelton gave the film a C rating. Chris Nashawaty of Entertainment Weekly gave the film a B− rating. Betsy Sharkey of Los Angeles Times criticized the film: "The great failing of The Iceman is not in giving us a monster, but in not making us care", she wrote. Jason Gorber of Twitch Film wrote: "Like a stiff mixed drink that doesn't live up to the quality of its ingredients, The Iceman proves to be an unpalatable, underwhelming crime drama."

References

External links
 
 
 
 
 
 

2012 films
2012 biographical drama films
2012 crime drama films
2012 crime thriller films
2010s serial killer films
2012 thriller drama films
American biographical drama films
American crime drama films
American crime thriller films
American independent films
American serial killer films
American thriller drama films
American gangster films
Biographical films about gangsters
Biographical films about contract killers
Bureau of Alcohol, Tobacco, Firearms and Explosives in fiction
Drama films based on actual events
Films based on American novels
Films based on organized crime novels
Films directed by Ariel Vromen
Films set in New Jersey
Films set in New York (state)
Films set in 1964
Films set in 1975
Films set in 1986
Films shot in Los Angeles
Films shot in Louisiana
Films shot in New York (state)
Films shot in New York City
Thriller films based on actual events
2012 independent films
2010s English-language films
Films produced by Avi Lerner
2010s American films